Woop Woop is an Australian and New Zealand term meaning a place that is a far distance from anything. Equivalent terms include "beyond the black stump" and "dingo woop woop" (also Australia), "the boondocks" (Southern United States) and "out in the sticks" or "the back of beyond" (UK).

Etymology
The term is said to have been derived from the nickname given to men who carried fleeces in shearing sheds, after the sound they made as they ran around. Grubba Grubba is also another version commonly found outback in the Kimberley. It was also the name of a sawmill near the town of Wilga in South West of Western Australia that was abandoned in 1984.  The term was being used in the early 1900s to describe a mythical outback town.

The term was also used in a book about the Ghan train, published in 2021, titled The Train to Oodna-woop-woop – The story of The Ghan.

Whoop Whoop is the name of an Antarctic field camp on the ice plateau 40 km (25 miles) east of Davis Station, used as a ski landing area (SLA) in late summer when the early summer sea ice SLAs adjacent to Davis are unusable.

See also

 Outback
 The bush
 Welcome to Woop Woop

References

Australian slang
Rural culture in Oceania